These quarterbacks have started at least one game for the National Football League (NFL)'s Arizona Cardinals. They are listed in order of the date of each player's first start at quarterback for the Cardinals.

Seasons

The number of games they started during the season is listed in parentheses:

Most games started
These quarterbacks have the most starts for the Cardinals in regular season games (through the 2022 NFL season).

Team career passing records

(Through the 2022 NFL season)

See also
 List of NFL starting quarterbacks

References
 Arizona Cardinals Franchise Encyclopedia

Lists of National Football League quarterbacks by team

Quarterbacks